Fenton v. Thorley [1903] WN 149 is an English tort law case from the House of Lords, which deals with the definition of an "accident".

"'Accident' is used in the ordinary sense and means a mishap or untoward event not expected or designed."

See also
Tort reform
Accident Compensation Corporation

Further reading
—on the difficulty of the divide between "accidents" and "disease"

English tort case law
House of Lords cases
1903 in case law
1903 in British law